Marquess Conyngham, of the County of Donegal, is a title in the Peerage of Ireland. It was created in 1816 for Henry Conyngham, 1st Earl Conyngham. He was the great-nephew of another Henry Conyngham, 1st Earl Conyngham, a member of a family of Scottish descent which had settled during the Plantation of Ulster in County Donegal in Ireland in the early 17th century. The 'founder' of the dynasty in Ireland was The Very Rev. Dr. Alexander Cunningham, Dean of Raphoe. The earlier Henry was a member of both the Irish House of Commons and the British House of Commons and served as Vice-Admiral of Ulster and as Governor of the counties of Donegal and Londonderry. In 1753 he was raised to the Peerage of Ireland as Baron Conyngham, of Mount Charles in the County of Donegal, and in 1756 he was created Viscount Conyngham, in Ireland, also in the Peerage of Ireland. In 1781 he was made Baron Conyngham, of Mount Charles in the County of Donegal, with remainder to his nephew Francis Burton, and Earl Conyngham, of Mount Charles in the County of Donegal, which like the creations of 1753 and 1756 was created with normal remainder to the heirs male of his body. The latter titles were also in the Peerage of Ireland. Lord Conyngham was childless and on his death in 1781 the barony of 1753, the viscountcy and earldom became extinct while he was succeeded in the barony of 1781 according to the special remainder by his aforementioned nephew Francis. He was the eldest son of Mary, sister of the first Earl Conyngham, by her husband Francis Burton. The new 2nd Baron Conyngham, who had earlier represented Killybegs and County Clare in the Irish House of Commons, assumed by Royal licence the surname and arms of Conyngham on succeeding to the titles.

The 2nd Baron Conyngham was succeeded by his eldest twin son, Henry, the third Baron. He was a General in the British Army, one of the original 28 Irish Representative Peers, Governor of both County Donegal and County Clare and Lord Steward of the Household. He was created Viscount Conyngham, of Mount Charles in the County of Donegal, in 1789, Viscount Mount Charles and Earl Conyngham in 1797, and Viscount Slane, in the County of Meath, Earl of Mount Charles and Marquess Conyngham, of the County of Donegal, in 1816. All these titles were in the Peerage of Ireland. In 1821 he was also made Baron Minster, of Minster Abbey in the County of Kent, in the Peerage of the United Kingdom, which gave him an automatic seat in the House of Lords. He was succeeded by his second but eldest surviving son, Francis, the second Marquess. Like his father he was a General in the Army and also held government office as Postmaster General and as Lord Steward of the Household. His eldest son, George, the third Marquess, was a Lieutenant-General in the British Army. When he died the titles passed to his eldest son Henry, the fourth Marquess. He was Vice-Admiral of Ulster. Two of his sons, Victor, the fifth Marquess (who was aide-de-camp to Lieutenant General Sir John Grenfell Maxwell during World War I, and who died on 9 November 1918 in York), and Frederick, the sixth Marquess, both succeeded in the titles. Frederick's son, Frederick, succeeded him in 1974 as seventh Marquess, followed by his son Henry, the eighth Marquess, in 2009.

Several other members of the Conyngham and Burton families may also be mentioned. Henry Conyngham (died 1706), father of the first Earl Conyngham (of the 1718 creation), was a Major-General in the British Army and was killed in the War of the Spanish Succession. Francis Burton (died 1743), father of the second Baron Conyngham, was a Member of the Irish Parliament for Coleraine and County Clare. William Conyngham (who assumed the surname of Conyngham in lieu of Burton in 1781), younger son of Francis Burton and younger brother of the second Baron Conyngham, was a Member of the Irish Parliament and served as a Teller of the Exchequer. The Honourable Sir Francis Burton, second son of the second Baron, was a colonial administrator and Member of Parliament for County Clare. Elizabeth Conyngham, Marchioness Conyngham, wife of the first Marquess, was a mistress of King George IV. Henry Francis Conyngham, Earl of Mount Charles, eldest son of the first Marquess, represented County Donegal in the House of Commons but predeceased his father, unmarried. Lord Albert Denison Conyngham, third son of the first Marquess, assumed the surname of Denison in lieu of Conyngham in 1849 on succeeding to the vast fortune of his maternal uncle William Joseph Denison, and was raised to the peerage as Baron Londesborough the following year (see this title for more information on this branch of the family). Lady Jane Conyngham, second daughter of the first Marquess, was a Lady of the Bedchamber to Queen Victoria. Lord Francis Conyngham, second son of the second Marquess, was Member of Parliament for County Clare.

The family seat is Slane Castle in County Meath. A former family seat was The Hall in the village of Mountcharles, near Donegal Town in the south of County Donegal. The family surname is pronounced "Cunningum".

Baron Conyngham (1753-1781), Viscount Conyngham (1756-1781)
1st Baron Conyngham, 1st Viscount Conyngham (1705–1781) (Created Viscount Conyngham 1756, Earl Conyngham and a second Baron Conyngham 1781)

Earls Conyngham and Baron Conyngham (1781)
Henry, 1st (and last) Earl Conyngham, 1st (and last) Viscount Conyngham, 1st (and last) Baron Conyngham (1753 creation), 1st Baron Conyngham (1781 creation) (1705–1781)

Barons Conyngham (1781; Reverted)
Francis Pierpoint Conyngham, 2nd Baron Conyngham, nephew of Henry Conyngham, 1st Earl Conyngham (died 1787)
Henry Conyngham, 3rd Baron Conyngham (1766–1832) (created Viscount Conyngham in 1789, Earl Conyngham in 1797, and Viscount Slane, Earl of Mount Charles, Marquess Conyngham in 1816 and Baron Minster in 1821)

Marquesses Conyngham (1816)

Henry Conyngham, 1st Marquess Conyngham (1766–1832)
Henry Francis Conyngham, Earl of Mount Charles (1795–1824)
Francis Nathaniel Conyngham, 2nd Marquess Conyngham (1797–1876)
George Henry Conyngham, 3rd Marquess Conyngham (1825–1882)
Henry Francis Conyngham, 4th Marquess Conyngham (1857–1897)
Victor George Henry Francis Conyngham, 5th Marquess Conyngham (1883–1918)
Frederick William Burton Conyngham, 6th Marquess Conyngham (1890–1974)
Frederick William Henry Francis Conyngham, 7th Marquess Conyngham (1924–2009)
Henry Vivien Pierpont Conyngham, 8th Marquess Conyngham (born 1951)
The heir apparent is the present holder's son Alexander Burton Conyngham, Earl of Mount Charles (born 1975).
The heir apparent's heir apparent is his son Rory Nicholas Burton Conyngham, Viscount Slane (born 2010).

 Lt.-Gen. Henry Conyngham (d. 1705/6)
  Henry Conyngham, 1st Baron Conyngham, 1st Earl Conyngham (1705–1781)
 Mary Conyngham (d. 1737)
  Francis Pierpoint Conyngham, 2nd Baron Conyngham (c. 1730 – 1787)
  General Sir Henry Conyngham, 1st Marquess Conyngham (1766–1832)
 Henry Francis Conyngham, Earl of Mount Charles (1795–1824)
  General Sir Francis Nathaniel Conyngham, 2nd Marquess Conyngham (1797–1876)
  General George Henry Conyngham, 3rd Marquess Conyngham (1825–1882)
  Henry Francis Conyngham, 4th Marquess Conyngham (1857–1897)
  Victor George Henry Francis Conyngham, 5th Marquess Conyngham (1883–1918)
  Frederick William Burton Conyngham, 6th Marquess Conyngham (1890–1974)
  Frederick William Henry Francis Conyngham, 7th Marquess Conyngham (1924–2009)
  Henry Vivien Pierpont Conyngham, 8th Marquess Conyngham (born 1951)
 (1) Alexander Burton Conyngham, Earl of Mount Charles (born 1975)
 (2) Rory Nicholas Burton Conyngham, Viscount Slane (born 2010)
 (3) Hon. Caspar Conyngham (born 2012)
 (4) Lord Simon Charles Eveleigh Wren Conyngham (born 1953)
 (5) Lord Frederick William Patrick Conyngham (born 1959)
 (6) Lord John Victor Albert Blosse Conyngham (born 1926)
  Albert Denison Denison, 1st Baron Londesborough (1805–1860)
 Hon. Harold Albert Denison (1856–1948)
  John Albert Lister Denison, 8th Baron Londesborough (1901–1968)
 (7)  Richard John Denison, 9th Baron Londesborough (born 1959)
 (1, 8) Hon. James Frederick Denison (born 1990)

See also
Baron Londesborough

References

Attribution

Kidd, Charles & Williamson, David (editors). Debrett's Peerage and Baronetage (1990 edition). New York: St Martin's Press, 1990, 

Marquessates in the Peerage of Ireland
Noble titles created in 1816
Marquess